The Sonata in C major for piano four-hands, K. 521, is a piano sonata in three movements composed by Wolfgang Amadeus Mozart in 1787. It was his last complete piano duet sonata for one piano, four hands. This sonata consists of three movements: Allegro, Andante and Allegretto.

Dedication and context

In Mozart's thematic catalog, the piece was dated May 29, 1787. On that same day, he also received word of his father's death. Mozart then shared the sad news with his close friend Gottfried von Jacquin, a Viennese court official and amateur musician, and subsequently dedicated the piece to Gottfried's sister, Franziska von Jacquin. In Mozart's letter to Gottfried, he noted that the piece is "rather difficult" and therefore instructed Franziska to "tackle it at once".

This piece was published at the turn of the year 1787/1788 by music publisher Franz Anton Hoffmeister. Instead of Mozart's original intention to dedicate it to Franziska von Jacquin, one of his most talented pupils, it was dedicated to Nanette and Barbette Natrop, daughters of Viennese businessman Franz Wilhelm Natorp, also in the Jacquin circle.

Movements

I. Allegro (C major) 

The first movement begins with the Primo and Secondo parts playing in unison, presenting the main theme with both vigor and delicacy. After the initial phrase, follows an tasteful and refined dialog between Primo and Secondo. A gracious second theme comes after the sixteenth note descending scales and a slight pause at the end of the first theme.

II. Andante (F major)

This slow and melancholic second movement takes a ternary form of A–B–A. The outer sections (A sections) bear a lyrical and gentle quality, while the middle section (B section) has difficult triplets runs that give a rather tense feeling.

III. Allegretto (C major)

The third movement is a rondo. Its main theme begins with a relaxed "music-box naivety" full of glamour and humor.

Notable performances 

References

External links 
 
 
 , Susan Merdinger and Steven Greene, 2013

Piano sonatas by Wolfgang Amadeus Mozart
Compositions for piano four-hands
Music dedicated to family or friends
1787 compositions
Compositions in C major